John Starkey may refer to:

John Starkey (Canterbury MP) (by 1503 – 1554), Member of Parliament for Canterbury, England, in 1539
John Starkey (publisher), active in London in the second half of the 17th century
John Starkey (North Carolina), North Carolina State Treasurer 1750–1765
Sir John Starkey, 1st Baronet (1859–1940), British Conservative Party politician

See also
John Starkie (1830–1888), British Conservative Party politician